Elgin McCann (born July 2, 1946) is a former professional ice hockey right winger. He was drafted in the first round, eighth overall, by the Montreal Canadiens in the 1967 NHL Amateur Draft.  He never played in the National Hockey League, however, spending his career playing for various minor-league teams.

McCann was born in Vancouver, British Columbia.

Career statistics

References

External links

1967 NHL Amateur Draft - Elgin McCann

1946 births
Amarillo Wranglers players
Canadian ice hockey right wingers
Columbus Owls players
Houston Apollos players
Ice hockey people from Vancouver
Kalamazoo Wings (1974–2000) players
Living people
Memphis South Stars players
Montreal Canadiens draft picks
Muskegon Mohawks players
National Hockey League first-round draft picks
New Haven Blades players
New Haven Nighthawks players
Saginaw Gears players